Boris Policeband (a.k.a. Policeband & a.k.a. Boris Pearlman a.k.a. Mark Perelman) was a no wave noise music performer who used dissonant violin, police radio transmissions, and voice. Boris Pearlman was a classically trained violist from New York City.

Life and work

Boris Pearlman joined proto no wave band Jack Ruby in 1973 playing viola "electrified...by running it through an FM transmitter and a bunch police walkie-talkies that he strapped around his waist.". Randy Cohen was also in the group. George Scott III who later played with Lydia Lunch, James Chance and John Cale (among others) joined in 1975, they broke up in 1977. He became known as Boris Policeband after a live performance in 1976 during which he monitored, on headphones, police communications from a scanner and recited their chatter while he accompanied himself on electric violin.  Boris was fascinated by cop culture and the often prosaic and sometimes poetic reality of law enforcement chatter. Over the years the cop-talk and violin-screech coalesced into discrete songs that at times recalls the dissonant violin playing of the Fluxus artist Henry Flynt.

In 1978 Sylvère Lotringer conducted a one-page interview with Policeband (with a one-page photo) in Columbia University's philosophy department publication of Semiotext(e) called Schizo-Culture: The Event, The Book.

In 1979 Boris Policeband released a 7" recording called: Policeband: Stereo / Mono that was produced by artist Dike Blair. He also appears with two tracks on the no wave recording New York Noise Vol. 3 that was released in 2006.

His live noise music performances were extremely loud/edgy aggressive/dissonant, and even though most songs were under a minute long and a set rarely exceeded 10 minutes, Boris could quickly empty a room. That was something he took pride in.

He appears in the film that Coleen Fitzgibbon and Alan W. Moore created in 1978 (finished in 2009) of a no wave concert to benefit Colab called X Magazine Benefit that documents a performance of Boris Policeband, along with those of DNA and James Chance and the Contortions. Shot in black and white super-8 the film captures the gritty look and sound of the music scene during that era. In 2013 it was exhibited at Salon 94, an art gallery in New York City.

Boris, a self-proclaimed materialistic-socialist who practiced antidisestablishmentarianism, was a downtown post-punk club fixture. His days were spent combing through SoHo art galleries, as he was fascinated with conceptual art, and Lower East Side pawnshops for material to add to his collection of used books, sunglasses (which he was never seen without), and wristwatches. Every night he was in no wave clubs, like CBGBs, Tier 3 and the Mudd Club, where he leaned against a wall while listening to classical music with an ear plug on his transistor radio while engaging in snappy repartee and/or swapping insults with other club goers.

Boris ended Policeband in the mid-80s to pursue classical viola.

Footnotes

References
Carlo McCormick, The Downtown Book: The New York Art Scene, 1974–1984, Princeton University Press, 2006
Masters, Marc. No Wave, London: Black Dog Publishing, 2007
Sylvère Lotringer & David Morris (Eds), Schizo-Culture: The Event, The Book, Semiotext(e), 1978, re-published in 2013, pp. 64–64

External links
"X-Magazine Benefit." A film by Coleen Fitzgibbon and Alan W. Moore 1978/2009, video, 11 minutes."Colab's X Magazine Benefit" documents the punk rock performances ofDNA, James Chance and the Contortions, and Boris Policeband

See also
Mudd Club
Tier 3
Just Another Asshole

Postmodern artists
Artists from New York (state)
American sound artists
American experimental musicians
American noise musicians
No wave musicians